Mehwish Khan (born 1990) is an international footballer from Pakistan. She was the first woman footballer to score an international goal for Pakistan. She scored in the 2–1 win over Maldives at the SAFF Women's Football Championships held in Dhaka, Bangladesh in December 2010.

Background
Khan come from a Pathan family.

Career
Khan started playing as a striker for Diya Women Football Club.

International Statistics

References

Pakistani women's footballers
Pakistan women's international footballers
Pashtun women
Living people
1990 births
Footballers from Karachi
Diya W.F.C. players
Women's association footballers not categorized by position